Richard "Rabbit" Brown (c. 1880 – 1937) was an American blues guitarist and composer. His music has been characterized as a mixture of blues, pop songs, and original topical ballads. He recorded six sides for Victor Records on March 11, 1927, one of which, "James Alley", is included in the 1952 Anthology of American Folk Music and has been covered by Bob Dylan, among others.

The rock critic Greil Marcus has called Brown's recording of "James Alley" "the greatest recording ever made."

Biography
Brown was most likely born around 1880 New Orleans, Louisiana. He lived in New Orleans from his youth on. He eventually moved to the Battlefield, a rough district of the city, where several events inspired some of the songs he later wrote. He mainly performed at nightclubs and on the street.

Including the recording also selected for the Anthology of American Folk Music five of Brown's six known recordings appear on the compilation album The Greatest Songsters: Complete Works (1927–1929). His sixth recorded song, “Great Northern Blues,” was not released and is considered to be lost.

Brown died in 1937, probably in New Orleans.

Topical songwriting

At least four of Brown's most popular songs were topical ballads.  "The Downfall of the Lion" and "Gyp the Blood" were based on events that occurred in New Orleans. Neither of these songs was recorded, but both were later remembered and named by Brown's contemporaries.

Two of Brown's recorded songs, "The Mystery of the Dunbar's Child," and "The Sinking of the Titanic," are considered to be original topical songs, and not "folk" songs in the sense of being passed along from performer to performer with slight variations.

Blind Willie Harris

An anthology of rural acoustic gospel music, Goodbye, Babylon, released in 2003, included one of the two known recordings by an otherwise undocumented singer named Blind Willie Harris. This piece, "Where He Leads Me I Will Follow," was recorded in New Orleans in 1929, and in describing it, the authors of the CD liner notes pointed out its "strikingly similar" resemblance to Richard Brown's 1927 New Orleans recordings. Since then, more discussion has ensued among early blues and gospel collectors and scholars, leading many to state without equivocation that Harris was a pseudonym of Brown's, although no documents linking the name Harris with Brown have been found.

Quotation

—Rabbit Brown

See also
List of blues musicians
Music of Louisiana

References

External links
"Times Ain't Like They Used to Be: Rabbit Brown, New Orleans Songster"  by Kevin S. Fontenot - from Bluesworld
Illustrated Richard Rabbit Brown discography, including also Blind Willie Harris
Artist Direct: Richard Rabbit Brown

1880s births
1937 deaths
20th-century African-American male singers
American blues guitarists
American male guitarists
American blues singers
Country blues musicians
Blues musicians from New Orleans
Singers from Louisiana
Guitarists from Louisiana
20th-century American guitarists
African-American guitarists